The women's shot put at the 2022 World Athletics Championships was held at the Hayward Field in Eugene on 15 and 16 July 2022.

Summary

Three weeks after winning the American Championship with a world leading 20.51.m, Chase Ealey returned to the same ring. Double defending champion and Olympic Gold Medalist Gong Lijiao threw 19.77m to settle into second place with Auriol Dongmo 19.44m and Gong's Chinese teammate Song Jiayuan 19.21m the only ones past 19 metres. In the second round, Gong improved her hold on second place with a 19.84m, which became significant when Dongmo improved to 19.62m two throws later. Next in the ring, Jessica Schilder took away the bronze medal position with a Dutch record 19.77m. By that point in the second round, the medal positions were settled. Gong improved to 20.23m in the third round, and 20.39m in the fifth round, but still fell 10 cm short of Ealey. Schilder tied her national record in the fifth round, which became the tiebreaker after Sarah Mitton had equalled the 19.77m three throws earlier.

Records
Before the competition records were as follows:

Qualification standard
The standard to qualify automatically for entry was 18.50 m.

Schedule
The event schedule, in local time (UTC−7), was as follows:

Results

Qualification 

Qualification: Qualifying Performance 18.90 (Q) or at least 12 best performers (q) advanced to the final.

Final

References

Shot put
Shot put at the World Athletics Championships